John Sadler is a British historian specialising in the Anglo-Scottish Border conflicts during the Middle Ages. Sadler is a regular contributor to military and historical journals and has published a number of books on the subject. Some of his books were written in collaboration with Rosie Serdiville. He has taught and tutored history as well.

Sadler is a member of the living history group Time Bandits.

Selected works
 (1988) Battle for Northumbria, UK: Bridge Studios 
 (1996) Scottish Battles
 (2000) War in the North 1461–1464
 (2005) Clan MacDonald's Greatest Defeat: The Battle of Harlaw 1411, UK: NPI Media Group, 
 (2005) Border Fury: England and Scotland at War 1296–1568, UK: Pearson Education Ltd, 
 (2006) Culloden: The Last Charge of the Highland Clans, UK: NPI Media Group, 
 (2006) Raiders and Reivers
 (2006) Flodden 1513
 (2014) Blood Divide: A Novel of Flodden Field

References

External links
Official Website

Year of birth missing (living people)
Living people
British historians
British medievalists
British military historians
Place of birth missing (living people)